Eiffelospongia is a genus of sponge known from the Mount Stephen Trilobite Beds.

References

External links 
 

Hexactinellida genera
Prehistoric sponge genera
Burgess Shale sponges

Cambrian genus extinctions